Mohamed Fadhel Ben Achour (October 16, 1909 – April 20, 1970) was a Tunisian theologian, writer, trade unionist, intellectual and patriot born in La Marsa.

Biography 
Born October 16, 1909, in a family of Scholars, Magistrates and High Officials of the upper middle class of Tunisia, he began to learn the Quran and Arabic grammar from the age of three years. He also learns French language at the age of nine. He made his entry in 1922 in Zitouna where he is directly enrolled in second year. In 1928, he obtained the first diploma of Zitounian high school leaving, then called tatwi. In 1931, he enrolled at the Faculty of Letters of Algiers as a free auditor. He then rapidly gravitated to the various ranks of the Zitounian teachers: he succeeded in 1932 in the assistance of second-level teachers and, in 1935, in first-degree teachers at the University of Ez-Zitouna.

A few years later, he became director of the Khaldounia, General manager of the Institute of Islamic Research, annexed to Khaldounia, then the first Dean of the Faculty of Religious Sciences of Tunis and finally member of the Academy of the Arabic Language in Cairo and of the Arab Academy of Damascus.

Grand Mufti of the Tunisian Republic, he was one of the religious who defended the provisions of the Code of Personal Status in Tunisia.

Honours 
 1966 : Commander of the Order of the Republic of Tunisia
 1968 : Commander of the Order of Ouissam Alaouite of Morocco

Publications 
 The literary and intellectual movement in Tunisia, ed. The Arab League, Cairo, 1956
 The authors of Islamic thought in the Arab Maghreb, ed. Librairie Ennajah, Tunis, 1965
 The Quranic exegesis and its authors, ed. Maison orientale des livres, Tunis, 1966
 The foundations of literary Renaissance in Tunisia, ed. Librairie Ennajah, Tunis, 1968
 Biographies of illustrious men, ed. Maison tunisienne de l'édition, Tunis, 1970
 Afaal's Book, ed. Ben Abdallah, Tunis, 1972
 Maghrebian conferences, ed. Maison tunisienne de l'édition, Tunis, 1974
 The spirit of Islamic civilization, ed. Higher Institute of Islamic Sciences, Beirut, 1982
 Thinking flashes, deux tomes, ed. Maison arabe du livre, Tunis, 1982
 Conferences, éd. Centre de publications universitaires, Tunis, 1998

References

Tunisian Muslim theologians
Tunisian Maliki scholars
Tunisian writers
1909 births
1970 deaths
People from La Marsa
Grand Muftis of Tunisia
Tunisian male writers
20th-century Tunisian writers
Members of Academy of the Arabic Language in Cairo